Byrd D. Crudup (September 15, 1897 – March 12, 1960) was an American football and basketball coach and college athletics administrator. He served as the head football coach at the North Carolina College for Negroes—now known as North Carolina Central University in Durham, North Carolina—from 1929 to 1931, Dillard University in New Orleans, Louisiana from 1935 to 1940, and at Johnson C. Smith University in Charlotte, North Carolina from 1946 to 1949. Crudup was also head basketball coach at North Carolina Central for one season, in 1927–28.

Early life, playing career, and education
Crudup was born on September 15, 1897, in Edenton, North Carolina, to Byrd Crudup and Delia Stark Crudup. He graduated from Rindge Manual Training School in Cambridge, Massachusetts. Crudup played college football at Lincoln University in Oxford, Pennsylvania. He was named to the All-Colored Intercollegiate Athletic Association (CIAA) team in 1923 and 1924 and was captain of the 1924 Lincoln Lions football team, which won the CIAA title and a black college football national championship.

Crudup graduated from Lincoln with an A.B. degree in 1925 and earned Master of Education degree from Boston University in 1939. He also did additional studies at Boston University and Harvard University.

Head coaching record

Football

References

1897 births
1960 deaths
American football ends
Dillard Bleu Devils and Lady Bleu Devils athletic directors
Dillard Bleu Devils football coaches
Johnson C. Smith Golden Bulls and Lady Golden Bulls athletic directors
Johnson C. Smith Golden Bulls football coaches
Lincoln Lions football players
North Carolina Central Eagles football coaches
North Carolina Central Eagles men's basketball coaches
Boston University alumni
Cambridge Rindge and Latin School alumni
Harvard University alumni
People from Chowan County, North Carolina
Sportspeople from Cambridge, Massachusetts
Coaches of American football from Massachusetts
Players of American football from Massachusetts
Basketball coaches from Massachusetts
African-American college athletic directors in the United States
African-American coaches of American football
African-American players of American football
African-American basketball coaches
20th-century African-American sportspeople